The Rietberg Museum is a museum in Zürich, Switzerland, displaying Asian, African, American and Oceanian art.  It is the only art museum focusing on non-European art and design in Switzerland, the third-largest museum in Zürich, and the largest to be run by the city itself.  In 2007, it received approximately 157,000 visitors.

Location and buildings

The Rietberg Museum is situated in the  Rieterpark in central Zürich, on the western shores of the Lake Zurich, and consists of several historic buildings: the Wesendonck Villa, the Remise (or "Depot"), the Rieter Park-Villa, and the Schönberg Villa.  In 2007 a new building, designed by Alfred Grazioli and Adolf Krischanitz, was opened – the addition of this largely subterranean building, known as "Smaragd", more than doubled the museum's exhibition space.

The Rieterpark is located near Zürich Enge railway station, and can also be reached by tram line #7 and bus line #33.

History
In the early 1940s, the city of Zürich purchased the Rieterpark and the Wesendonck Villa.  In 1949, the villa was selected, by referendum, to be rebuilt into a museum for the art collection of Baron von der Heydt which he had donated to the city in 1945.  This was carried out in 1951-52 under the architect Alfred Gradmann.  The Rietberg Museum was opened on 24 May 1952.  Johannes Itten, the Swiss expressionist painter, was director of the museum until 1956.

In 1976, the city acquired the Schönberg Villa, which had been threatened with demolition, and opened it in 1978 as an extension of the museum.  Today, the villa is also home to an extensive non-lending library administrated by the museum.

Organisation and funding

The Rietberg Museum is operated by the presidential department of the city of Zürich.  In 2007, it employed around one hundred people.  About half of the funding comes from the city, while the other half is raised through revenue, sponsors, and donations.  Additions to the collection come mostly from donations.

Publishing activities
The museum established an in-house press shortly after its founding in 1952.  Initially, it published catalogues of the museum's Asian and African artworks, as well as occasional short monographs.  The museum's publishing activity has increased since 1985, in connection with the large special exhibitions that it has organised since then, and it now publishes around five new titles per year. 

Since 1991, the museum also publishes Artibus Asiae, a biannual scholarly journal on the arts and archaeology of Asia.

Sculpture

Painting

References

External links

 Rietberg Museum website—
 3D Google Earth model of museum complex

Art museums and galleries in Zurich
Anthropology museums
African art museums
Asian art museums in Switzerland
Mesoamerican art museums
Cultural property of national significance in the canton of Zürich
Art museums established in 1952
1952 establishments in Switzerland